Men's Giant Slalom and Super G World Cup 1982/1983

Calendar

Final point standings

In Men's Giant Slalom and Super G World Cup 1982/83 the best 5 results count.

Men's Giant Slalom and Super G Team Results

All points were shown including individuel deduction. bold indicate highest score - italics indicate race wins

References
 fis-ski.com

World Cup
FIS Alpine Ski World Cup men's giant slalom discipline titles
FIS Alpine Ski World Cup men's Super-G discipline titles